Timothy Avelin Roughgarden is an American computer scientist and a professor of Computer Science at Columbia University. Roughgarden's work deals primarily with game theoretic questions in computer science.

Roughgarden received his Ph.D. from Cornell University in 2002, under the supervision of Éva Tardos. He did a postdoc at University of California, Berkeley in 2004. From 2004 to 2018, Roughgarden was a professor at the Computer Science department at Stanford University working on algorithms and game theory. Roughgarden teaches a four-part algorithms specialization on Coursera.

He received the Danny Lewin award at STOC 2002 for the best student paper. He received the Presidential Early Career Award for Scientists and Engineers in 2007, the Grace Murray Hopper Award in 2009, and the Gödel Prize in 2012 for his work on routing traffic in large-scale communication networks to optimize performance of a congested network. He received a Guggenheim Fellowship in 2017 and the Kalai Prize in 2016.

Roughgarden is a co-editor of the 2016 textbook Algorithmic Game Theory, as well as the author of two chapters (Introduction to the Inefficiency of Equilibria and Routing Games).

Selected publications

References

External links
 Mathematics Genealogy Project
Roughgarden's textbook: Algorithmic Game Theory

Living people
Theoretical computer scientists
Columbia University faculty
Stanford University faculty
Gödel Prize laureates
1975 births